Leslie Charles Curran (19 April 1903 – 16 September 1972) was a barrister and British Conservative Party politician.

Background
He was the son of C. J. Curran, and educated at Cardiff High School and Stonyhurst College, a large independent school.

Career
Curran was a sub-editor of the Evening Express, before becoming a barrister in 1932 of Gray's Inn.

Curran was elected Member of Parliament (MP) for Uxbridge for three terms: from 1959 to 1966, when he lost to Labour; he regained the seat in 1970, holding it until he died in 1972.  Michael Shersby of his party was elected to succeed him in the subsequent by-election. Curran published one satirical novel, You Know You Can Trust Me (Jonathan Cape, 1938).

Curran is probably most remembered for a speech he made in the House on 19 June 1964, in which he mistook deliberately nonsensical poems written by John Lennon that had been published in the United States and the UK, as a sign of Lennon being illiterate. Fellow Conservative Norman Miscampbell tried to downplay and make light of the misunderstanding, feeling that his words would be disastrous for the party in the upcoming elections that year.

Personal life
Curran married Mona Regan and had one son. He died in Nicosia, Cyprus on 16 September 1972.

References

External links 

1903 births
1972 deaths
Conservative Party (UK) MPs for English constituencies
UK MPs 1959–1964
UK MPs 1964–1966
UK MPs 1970–1974